Gérard de Cortanze (born 22 July 1948 in Paris) is a French writer, essayist, translator and literary critic.
He won the Prix Renaudot in 2002 for his historical novel Assam. 
He was made a chevalier of the Legion of Honor in 2009.

Career
He published essays on Paul Auster, J.M.G. Le Clézio, and the history of Surrealism. He collaborated with Le Figaro Magazine, as well as literary writing and is responsible for the Folio Biographies collection launched by Gallimard in 2005.

He translated works of Spanish writers, such as the Mexican Jose Emilio Pacheco, the Nicaraguan Rubén Darío, Argentine exile in France Juan José Saer, the notebooks of the Spanish painter Antonio Saura (1930–1998), and poems, like those of Peruvian poet Cesar Vallejo (1892–1938) and the Chilean Vicente Huidobro (1893–1948).

He is President of the Jury Prize for the Jean Monnet prize, European department of Charente, awarded annually since 1995, to reward a European writer for a book written or translated into French.

The award-winning Assam tells the story of Aventino Roero Di Cortanze, an Italian aristocrat at the time of the French invasion of Italy. The first section of the story dramatizes his response to the invasion and his involvement in the battle scenes, which are perhaps modelled on those in War and Peace or Red Badge of Courage. The second section describes a trip to south Asia under the influence of a friend who is eager to find a way to develop an Indian tea trade within Italy to compete with the tea trade with China that Britain was developing at this time. In the third section, Aventino returns to occupied Italy and must choose between cooperation with the victorious French, joining the Austrians (themselves traditional enemies of his native Piedmont) and the promotion not only of Italian unity, but also an independent resistance movement or in other words an Italian maquis. This story, a French novel in which the French are the aggressors, naturally raises questions of France's own experience of being invaded by a major continental power in the 20th century.

Works

Novels
Gérard de Cortanze, René Major, Le livre de la morte, Paris, Aubier-Montaigne, coll. « Écrit Sur Parole », 1980 (reprint 1992), 
Les enfants s'ennuient le dimanche, Paris, Hachette, 1985, ; Arles, Actes Sud, coll. « Babel », 1999, 
Giuliana, Paris, Belfond, 1986, ; Arles, Actes Sud, coll. « Babel », 1999, 
Elle demande si c'est encore la nuit, Paris, Belfond, 1988, ; Paris-Monaco, Éditions du Rocher, 1991
L'amour dans la ville, Paris, Albin Michel, 1993, ; Paris, LGF, coll. « Livre de Poche », 1996, 
L'ange de mer, Paris, Flammarion, coll. « Littérature française », 1996, 
Une chambre à Turin, Paris-Monaco, Éditions du Rocher, 2001, ; Paris, Gallimard, coll. « Folio », 2002, 
Le cycle des vice-rois
Assam, Paris, Albin Michel, 2002, 
Aventino, Paris, Albin Michel, 2005, 
Les vice-rois, Arles, Actes Sud, 1998, ; Paris, J'ai lu, coll. « J'ai lu Roman », 2006, 
Cyclone, Arles, Actes Sud, 2000, ; Paris, J'ai lu, coll. « J'ai lu Roman », 2003, 
Banditi, Paris, Albin Michel, 2003, 
Spaghetti!, Paris, Gallimard, coll. « Haute enfance », 2005, 
Laura, Paris, Plon, 2005, 
Miss monde, Paris, Gallimard, coll. « Haute enfance », 2007, 
Claude Arnaud, Elisabeth Barillé, Gérard de Cortanze, Daniel Maximin, Paris *Portraits, Paris, Gallimard, coll. « Folio », 2007, « Le géorama Montparnasse »
De Gaulle en maillot de bain, Paris, Plon, 2007, 
Indigo, Paris, Plon, 2009, 
La belle endormie, Monaco-Paris, Le Serpent à Plumes, 2009, 
Miroirs, Paris, Plon, 2011, 
Les amants de Coyoacan, Paris, 2015,

Poetry
Altérations, Éditions d'Atelier, 1973
Au seuil: La fêlure, PJO, 1974
U. Cenote, Alain Anseuw éditeur, 1980
Los Angelitos, Richard Sébastian Imprimeur, 1980
La Muerte solar, Pre-textos, 1985
Jours dans l'échancrure de la nuque, Paris, La Différence, coll. « Littérature », 1988, 219 p. 
La Porte de Cordoue, Paris, La Différence, coll. « Littérature », 1989, 143 p. 
Le Mouvement des choses, Paris, La Différence, coll. « Clepsydre », 1999, 189 p. . Prix SGDL-Charles Vildrac, 1999.

Non-fiction

References

External links
Author's website

20th-century French novelists
20th-century French male writers
21st-century French novelists
1948 births
Writers from Paris
Living people
French people of Italian descent
French male novelists
Chevaliers of the Légion d'honneur
21st-century French male writers
Prix Renaudot winners